Wang Zhu is the name of:

 Wong Tsu or Wang Zhu (1893–1965), Chinese aircraft designer
 Wang Zhu (motorcyclist) (born 1987), Chinese motorcycle racer